Hawa Football Club or simply Hawa FC is a football team from Brunei, playing in the Belait District League. The club was founded in 2014.

History 
Hawa FT participated in the 2015 Telbru Futsal Premier League. 

Competing for a spot in the Brunei Premier League in 2017, Hawa FT lost out to DSP United in the qualifying round.

Hawa FT participated in the 2019 Belait District League, and went all the way to the semi-final where they were beaten by JDB FT. They finished fourth after losing to Hoist FT in the third-place playoff.

Hawa FC participated in subsequent Belait District League campaigns, finally winning the league in 2022. They also participated in the 2022 Brunei FA Cup the same year, advancing to the Round of 16 where they were knocked out by Panchor Murai FC.

Current squad

Honours
 Belait District League: 2022

See also 

 List of football clubs in Brunei

References

Association football clubs established in 2014
Football clubs in Brunei
Works association football teams